Lucigadus is a genus of rattails.

Species
There are currently 7 recognized species in this genus:
 Lucigadus acrolophus Iwamoto & Merrett, 1997
 Lucigadus borealis Iwamoto & Okamoto, 2015 
 Lucigadus lucifer (H.M. Smith & Radcliffe, 1912)
 Lucigadus microlepis (Günther, 1878) (Small-fin whiptail)
 Lucigadus nigromaculatus (McCulloch, 1907) (Black-spotted grenadier)
 Lucigadus nigromarginatus (H. M. Smith & Radcliffe, 1912)
 Lucigadus ori (J. L. B. Smith, 1968) (Bronze whiptail)

References

Macrouridae